Svetlogorsky District is an administrative district (raion), one of the fifteen in Kaliningrad Oblast, Russia. As a municipal division, it is incorporated as Svetlogorsky Municipal District. It is located in the west of the oblast. Its administrative center is the town of Svetlogorsk. As of the 2010 Census, the total population of the district was 14,875, with the population of Svetlogorsk accounting for 72.4% of that number.

References

Notes

Sources

Districts of Kaliningrad Oblast
Svetlogorsky District